Camal Youssoufa M'Madi (born 3 November 1994) is a Comorian professional footballer who plays as a left-back and centre-back for Championnat National 3 side Paris Saint-Germain B. He has played six international matches for Comoros.

References

External links

1994 births
Living people
Comorian footballers
Association football fullbacks
Comoros international footballers
OGC Nice players
Valenciennes FC players
Olympique Saint-Quentin players
AC Amiens players
Les Herbiers VF players
Football Club 93 Bobigny-Bagnolet-Gagny players
SC Schiltigheim players
Paris Saint-Germain F.C. players
Championnat National 2 players
Championnat National 3 players
Comorian expatriate footballers
Comorian expatriate sportspeople in France
Expatriate footballers in France